TSV Großhadern is a German association football club from the city of Munich, Bavaria.

History
The club was established in 1926 as the gymnastics club Turnverein Großhadern. On 1 January 1934 the club grew with the addition of the former membership of Fußball Club 1932 Hadern, which led to the creation of a football department within TV. In 1948, the club was renamed Turn- und Sportverein Großhadern.

Following a Landesliga title, TSV played a single season in the Amateuroberliga Bayern (III) in 1986–87 and was relegated after finishing 17th. Between 2007–10, the team played as a lower table side in the Landesliga Bayern-Süd (VI). In 2011–12 they competed in the Bezirksliga Oberbayern-Süd (VII) but were relegated once more, now to the Kreisliga, after finishing 13th.

Großhadern spend only one season at Kreisliga level before a league championship earned the club promotion back to the Bezirksliga. After three Bezirksliga seasons as a lower table side the club was relegated back to the Kreisliga in 2016.

The club has a membership of over 3,000 and in addition to its football side has departments for Aikido, climbing, fitness, gymnastics, handball, Judo, tennis, volleyball.

Honours
The club's honours:
 Landesliga Bayern-Süd
 Champions: 1986
 Bezirksoberliga Oberbayern
 Champions: 1994, 2005
 Bezirksliga Oberbayern-Süd
 Champions: 2004
 Kreisliga München 2
 Champions: 2013

Recent seasons
The recent season-by-season performance of the club:

With the introduction of the Bezirksoberligas in 1988 as the new fifth tier, below the Landesligas, all leagues below dropped one tier. With the introduction of the Regionalligas in 1994 and the 3. Liga in 2008 as the new third tier, below the 2. Bundesliga, all leagues below dropped one tier. With the establishment of the Regionalliga Bayern as the new fourth tier in Bavaria in 2012 the Bayernliga was split into a northern and a southern division, the number of Landesligas expanded from three to five and the Bezirksoberligas abolished. All leagues from the Bezirksligas onwards were elevated one tier.

References

External links
 Official team site  
 Das deutsche Fußball-Archiv  historical German domestic league tables
 Manfreds Fussball Archiv  Tables and results from the Bavarian amateur leagues

Football clubs in Germany
Football clubs in Bavaria
Football in Upper Bavaria
1926 establishments in Germany
Association football clubs established in 1926